"Crush on You" is the second single released in 1986 from the Jets' debut album The Jets. The song reached number three on the Billboard Hot 100 and number five on the UK Singles Chart. Jerry Knight and Aaron Zigman co-wrote the hit single which put the Jets on the charts.

Music video
In the music video, filmed on December 26, 1985, the Jets play the song and dance to it. It was directed by Stephen Rivkin and produced by Darrell Brand. Unlike the album version, which is 4:30, the music video version is shortened to 3:41. In 2019, Brand uploaded an HD remaster of the music video to his personal YouTube channel as part of "a resume reel of [his] past work."

Track listings
7-inch single
 "Crush on You" – 3:40	
 "Right Before My Eyes" – 3:49

12-inch single
 "Crush on You" (Extended Version) - 6:35
 "Crush on You" (Radio Edit) - 5:25
 "Crush on You" (Instrumental) - 6:35

Credits
 Elizabeth Wolfgramm – vocals
 Moana Wolfgramm – vocals, keyboards
 Eugene Wolfgramm – vocals, percussion
 LeRoy Wolfgramm – electric guitars
 Haini Wolfgramm – bass
 Kathi Wolfgramm – keyboards
 Rudy Wolfgramm – drums
 Eddie Wolfgramm – percussion

Charts

Aaron Carter version

In August 1997, Aaron Carter released a cover of the song on his debut self-titled album, Aaron Carter. It reached the top ten in some countries worldwide, such as the UK and Australia.

Music video
In addition to Aaron Carter, his older brother Nick makes a cameo at the beginning of the video, where he consoles Aaron when he confides that the girl he's got a crush on is only into athletes, specifically basketball and football players and weightlifters, which Aaron refers to as a "muscle man". Before he leaves, Nick tells his younger brother to not worry about the other guys and to just be himself, saying that girls like that because he "knows these things".

After his brother leaves, Aaron finds a poster advertising a talent show taking place in the park, where he performs the song for the crowd. He also meets his crush while she watches some boys playing basketball, which leads Aaron to try to get her attention, which he cannot seem to do as she does not even acknowledge his presence. Even as he notices the girl flirting with some boys playing football, he is still having no luck and even imagines the football players she was with chasing him down as he's carrying the football. Unbeknownst to him, the first person he told about his crush told another person, and then another, playing a game of telephone until the news finally reaches the girl as he's performing. He seemingly wins the girl at the end as she kisses him on the cheek, but when another girl comes along with cotton candy in her hand, he decides to walk off with that other girl instead, leaving the original girl disappointed.

Track listing
 "Crush on You" (main mix) – 3:25	
 "Crush on You" (remix) – 4:07	
 "Crush on You" (Gary's mix) – 4:07	
 "Crush on You" (instrumental) – 4:02

Charts

Weekly charts

Year-end charts

Certifications

References

External links
 Link to YouTube video The Jets - Crush on You

1985 songs
1986 singles
1997 debut singles
The Jets (band) songs
Aaron Carter songs
MCA Records singles
Edel AG singles
Songs written by Aaron Zigman
Songs written by Jerry Knight
UK Independent Singles Chart number-one singles